Bradyville or Bradysville may refer to:

Bradysville, Ohio, an unincorporated community in Adams County
Bradyville, Tennessee, an unincorporated community in Cannon County
Bradyville, West Virginia, an unincorporated community